The Yablon is a river in Chukotka Autonomous Okrug, Russia.

The Yablon is a right tributary of the Anadyr. The river and its tributaries are frozen for between eight to nine months every year. The nearest village is Markovo, located to the east of the mouth.

History 
The formerly unexplored Yablon river, was surveyed in March 1870 by geographer and ethnologist Baron Gerhard von Maydell (1835–1894) during his pioneering research of East Siberia.

Course
The Yablon flows first northeastwards, then makes a wide bend roughly midway through its course and flows southeastwards splitting into multiple smaller channels. Finally it joins the right bank of the Anadyr a little upstream from the mouth of the Yeropol. The Yablon meets the Anadyr  from its mouth. 

The river basin is in a desolate, mountainous area of Chukotka where there are no inhabited places.

See also
List of rivers of Russia

References

External links
 Populations of wild and feral reindeer in Siberia and Far East of Russia - Map of Right side of Anadyr River Basin (Yablon, Peledon and Mechkereva Rivers) calving grounds.
Anadyr - Freshwater Ecoregions of the World

Rivers of Chukotka Autonomous Okrug